Round is an island in Seychelles, lying less than a mile (550 m) southeast of the island of Praslin tilted a little to the southeast of Praslin's easternmost Peninsula and 48 km north-east of the island of Mahe

Geography
Round is a granite island, its length from north to south is 380 m and width from west to east is 620 m. The island is covered with dense tropical vegetation. it has a 75-metre high summit, symmetrical in shape and surrounded by crystal clear water.

Once on the island grew endemic Lodoicea , but it was cut down for the cultivation of Coconut palms and production of Copra. 
The island is privately owned, and has a small luxury resort, and a private home of the owners family.

There is also a Round Island near the island of Mahé.

Tourism
Today, the island's main industry is tourism, and it is known for its beaches, especially Anse Chez Gabi. 
One can go on a boat trip or a diving trip around the island.

Image gallery

References 

Islands of Baie Sainte Anne
Private islands of Seychelles